

Launch statistics

Rocket configurations

Launch sites

Launch outcomes

1970

1971

1972

1973

1974

1975

1976

1977

1978

1979

Photo gallery

References

Atlas